The 2020–21 Goa Professional League was the 23rd season of the Goa Professional League, the top football league in the Indian state of Goa, since its establishment in 1996. The league season commenced on 27 January 2021.

Selvel Advertising Pvt Ltd is the title sponsor of Goa Professional League 2020-21 season. The Kolkata based media firm has signed a five-year deal with the state association for the sponsorship.

This season, the GPL was played with 12 teams in a single leg, which will have 66 matches and all of them will broadcast on an OTT app and will also have Square Circle as digital partners. The matches of the league were played at Duler Stadium, Mapusa, through to the end of April 2021.

Sporting Clube de Goa and Churchill Brothers were defending champions as the 13 remaining games could not be played last season due to the COVID-19 pandemic and the remaining teams wouldn't have topped the league even if they had played.

Teams

Format 
The competition has been cut short to single-leg fixtures across three months, as opposed to the two-legged system that was in place till the last season. Every team will face all the other teams once each and the side that finishes at the top spot on the points table at the end of the league will be declared champions.

Rules to note
 The team standing last in the league shall be demoted to GFA First Division season 2021–22.
 Only three substitutions per team will be allowed in each match. A maximum of seven substitutes will be allowed on the bench.
 A minimum of two U-20 players of Goan origin have to be present in the starting XI of both teams in each match.
 Only two foreign players can be fielded per match.

Standings

Six points have been deducted of SESA Football Academy as they fielded an ineligible player in two of their games.

Matches

Round 1

Round 2

Round 3

Round 4

Round 5

Round 6

Round 7

Round 8

Round 9

Round 10

Round 11

Statistics

Top scorers

Clean Sheets

References

Goa Professional League seasons